The 2022–23 season is the 115th season in the existence of Feyenoord and the club's 101st consecutive season in the top flight of Dutch football. In addition to the domestic league, Feyenoord are participating in this season's editions of the KNVB Cup and the Europa League.

Transfers

Summer window

In:

 (on loan)
 (on loan)

 (on loan)

 (on loan)
 (return from loan)

 (on loan)

 (return from loan)

 (return from loan)
 (return from loan)
 (return from loan)

Out:

 (return from loan)
 (return from loan)

 (return from loan)
 (on loan)
 (on loan)
 (on loan)
 (return from loan)
 (on loan)

 (on loan) 
 (on loan)
 (on loan)
 (return from loan)
 (on loan)

 (on loan)

Winter window

In:

Out:

 (return from loan)

Pre-season and friendlies

Competitions

Overall record

Eredivisie

League table

Results summary

Results by round

Matches
The preliminary league fixtures were announced on June 15, 2022, with the final league schedule being announced on June 17, 2022.

KNVB Cup

UEFA Europa League

The draw for the UEFA Europa League group stage was held on 26 August 2022.

Group stage

Knockout phase

Round of 16

Quarter-finals

Statistics

Player details

Appearances (Apps.) numbers are for appearances in competitive games only including sub appearances
Red card numbers denote: Numbers in parentheses represent red cards overturned for wrongful dismissal.
‡= Has been part of the matchday squad for an official match, but is not an official member of the first team.

Clean sheets
A player must have played at least 60 minutes, excluding stoppage time, for a clean sheet to be awarded.

References

Feyenoord seasons
Feyenoord
2022–23 UEFA Europa League participants seasons